Pierre Bourdin (born 8 January 1994) is a French footballer who plays for Challenger Pro League club Virton as a center back.

Club career
Bourdin joined Cercle Brugge in 2014 from Paris Saint-Germain F.C. B. He made his Belgian Pro League debut at 26 July 2014 at the opening game of the 2013–14 season against K.A.A. Gent.

On 4 January 2023, Bourdin joined Virton on an eighteen-month contract.

References

External links
 

1994 births
Living people
Association football defenders
French footballers
France youth international footballers
Cercle Brugge K.S.V. players
Lierse S.K. players
K Beerschot VA players
R.E. Virton players
Belgian Pro League players
Challenger Pro League players